Daniel de Jesus dos Santos (born 3 October 1984), known as Magrão, is a Brazilian footballer who plays as a forward.

In 2018, he signed in for Recreativo do Libolo in Angola's premier league, the Girabola.

Career statistics

References

External links

1984 births
Living people
Brazilian footballers
Brazilian expatriate footballers
Association football forwards
Campeonato Brasileiro Série B players
Campeonato Brasileiro Série C players
Campeonato Brasileiro Série D players
Girabola players
Barretos Esporte Clube players
Associação Atlética Caldense players
Clube Atlético Penapolense players
Clube Atlético Bragantino players
Sport Club Barueri players
Grêmio Barueri Futebol players
Oeste Futebol Clube players
Cuiabá Esporte Clube players
Mogi Mirim Esporte Clube players
Clube de Regatas Brasil players
Al-Markhiya SC players
Esporte Clube São Bento players
C.R.D. Libolo players
São Bernardo Futebol Clube players
Sertãozinho Futebol Clube players
Brazilian expatriate sportspeople in Qatar
Brazilian expatriate sportspeople in Angola
Expatriate footballers in Qatar
Expatriate footballers in Angola
People from Ribeirão Preto
Footballers from São Paulo (state)